Cathedral Street may refer to:

Places

Finland
Tuomiokirkonkatu, "Cathedral Street" in Tampere

Ireland
Cathedral Street, Dublin

United Kingdom
Cathedral Street, Dunkeld
Cathedral Street, Manchester

United States
 Cathedral Street (Baltimore)